Tim Waurick (born 1981) is a barbershop tenor singer, and coach for various barbershop choruses and quartets. Waurick creates learning tracks – recordings in which one part is dominant and the others are sung softly in the background – for the Barbershop Harmony Society, Sweet Adelines International, and various other quartets and choruses around the world. His learning track company is named TimTracks.

Waurick grew up and currently lives in Levittown, Pennsylvania. He used to live in St. Peters, Missouri, after graduating in 2007 from Lindenwood University in St. Charles, Missouri. He coaches men's and women's barbershop quartets and choruses worldwide, and is one of the few barbershop enthusiasts who has managed to turn his hobby into a profession. Waurick performs with Vocal Spectrum, who took the gold medal in the collegiate Barbershop Quartet Contest in 2004 and the International Barbershop Quartet Contest in 2006. Waurick also serves as the tenor section leader of the 2012 International Barbershop Chorus Champions the Ambassadors of Harmony. He has released several solo multi-track albums.

Waurick was selected in 2008 to be tenor of a Fantasy Gold Quartet, together with bass Jeff Oxley, baritone Tony DeRosa, and lead Joe Connelly; then again in 2015 with lead Mike Slamka, bass Jim Henry, and baritone Tony DeRosa.

Discography

References

External links
 TimTracks.com
 Vocal Spectrum Bio
 Artist Direct Store

1980 births
Barbershop Harmony Society
Barbershop music
Living people
Lindenwood University alumni
Musicians from Missouri
People from Bucks County, Pennsylvania
People from St. Peters, Missouri